David Buckingham may refer to:

 A. David Buckingham (1930–2021), Australian chemist
 David Buckingham (politician), Canadian politician
 David E. Buckingham (1840–1915), American soldier in the American Civil War
 David Buckingham (academic) (born 1954), media, communications and education scholar and academic
 David Buckingham (judge), American judge in Kentucky